Bayabusua is a genus of flowering plants belonging to the family Cucurbitaceae.

Its native range is Malaysian Peninsula.

Species:

Bayabusua clarkei

References

Cucurbitaceae
Cucurbitaceae genera